The Katpana Desert or Cold Desert  is a high-altitude desert located near Skardu, Gilgit-Baltistan, Pakistan. The desert contains large sand dunes that are sometimes covered in snow during the winters. While the desert technically stretches from the banks of Indus River in the south of Skardu to New Ranga Village in the north. The portion of the desert that is most frequented by tourists is located near Katpana Lake close to Skardu Airport.

Climate

Gallery

References

Deserts of Pakistan
Skardu District